Gas City is a city in Grant County, Indiana, along the Mississinewa River. The population was 5,965 at the 2010 census.

History
Gas City was first known as Harrisburg when settled on May 25, 1867, by Noah Harris. It became something of a boom town when natural gas was found in the area in 1887. The Gas City Land Company was founded on March 21, 1892, and the town of about 150 people changed its name to Gas City a few days later.  However, as of 2022 much of the gas is depleted.  (See Indiana gas boom.)

The Gas City High School, Thompson-Ray House, and West Ward School are listed on the National Register of Historic Places.

Gas City annually hosts the Ducktail Run Rod and Custom Car Show in the Fall. The "Ducktail Run," as it is known to locals,  is a large car show featuring vehicles from 1972 and older. In the year 2020, the Festival had 2,020 vehicles register to appear.

Geography
Gas City is located at  (40.488190, -85.605649).

Demographics

2010 census
As of the census of 2010, there were 5,965 people, 2,410 households, and 1,632 families living in the city. The racial makeup of the city was 96.2% White, 0.9% African American, 0.3% Native American, 0.4% Asian, 0.4% from other races, and 1.7% from two or more races. Hispanic or Latino of any race were 2.4% of the population.

There were 2,410 households, of which 34.0% had children under the age of 18 living with them, 47.2% were married couples living together, 15.1% had a female householder with no husband present, 5.4% had a male householder with no wife present, and 32.3% were non-families. 27.4% of all households were made up of individuals, and 11.6% had someone living alone who was 65 years of age or older. The average household size was 2.45 and the average family size was 2.92.

The median age in the city was 39.4 years. 24.6% of residents were under the age of 18; 7.4% were between the ages of 18 and 24; 25.6% were from 25 to 44; 27.1% were from 45 to 64; and 15.4% were 65 years of age or older. The gender makeup of the city was 48.2% male and 51.8% female.

2000 census
As of the census of 2000, there were 5,940 people, 2,393 households, and 1,643 families living in the city. The racial makeup of the city was 97.46% White, 0.30% African American, 0.32% Native American, 0.22% Asian, 0.07% Pacific Islander, 0.56% from other races, and 1.08% from two or more races. Hispanic or Latino of any race were 1.52% of the population.

There were 2,393 households, out of which 31.4% had children under the age of 18 living with them, 52.1% were married couples living together, 12.6% had a female householder with no husband present, and 31.3% were non-families. 26.8% of all households were made up of individuals, and 10.9% had someone living alone who was 65 years of age or older. The average household size was 2.46 and the average family size was 2.95.

In the city, the population was spread out, with 25.2% under the age of 18, 8.2% from 18 to 24, 29.1% from 25 to 44, 23.8% from 45 to 64, and 13.6% who were 65 years of age or older. The median age was 37 years. For every 100 females, there were 90.2 males. For every 100 females age 18 and over, there were 84.1 males.

The median income for a household in the city was $35,940, and the median income for a family was $42,056. Males had a median income of $34,020 versus $23,482 for females. The per capita income for the city was $18,295. About 8.1% of families and 10.2% of the population were below the poverty line, including 13.8% of those under age 18 and 8.3% of those age 65 or over.

Transport
Gas City is served by several state and federal routes:
  Interstate 69 (exit 259)
  U.S. Route 35
  State Road 22

Education
Gas City is home to the Mississinewa School Corporation, which features Mississinewa High School, R.J. Baskett Middle School, and Northview Elementary school all in the city. The town has a lending library, the Gas City-Mill Township Public Library.

References

External links
 City of Gas City, Indiana website (archived from 2017)

Cities in Indiana
Cities in Grant County, Indiana
Populated places established in 1867
1867 establishments in Indiana
Sundown towns in Indiana